Rocchetta Palafea is a comune (municipality) in the Province of Asti in the Italian region Piedmont, located about  southeast of Turin and about  southeast of Asti.

Rocchetta Palafea borders the following municipalities: Bistagno, Calamandrana, Cassinasco, Castel Boglione, Montabone, and Sessame.

References

External links
 Official website

Cities and towns in Piedmont